The 2021 Leaders' Summit on Climate was a virtual climate summit on April 22–23, 2021, organized by the Joe Biden administration, with leaders from various countries. At the summit Biden announced that greenhouse gas emissions by the United States would be reduced by 50% - 52% relative to the level of 2005 by 2030.  Overall, the commitments made at the summit reduce the gap between governments' current pledges and the 1.5 degrees target of the Paris Agreement  by 12% - 14%. If the pledges are accomplished, greenhouse gas emissions will fall by 2.6% - 3.7% more in comparison to the pledges before the summit. The results of the summit were described by Climate Action Tracker as a step forward in the fight against climate change.

Invited countries and their representatives

Results
At the summit Biden announced that greenhouse gas emissions by the United States would be reduced by 50% - 52% relative to the level of 2005 by 2030.  Overall, the commitments made at the summit reduce the gap between governments' current pledges and the 1.5 degrees target of the Paris Agreement  by 12% - 14%. If the pledges are accomplished, greenhouse gas emissions will fall by 2.6% - 3.7% GtCO2e more in comparison to the pledges before the summit. The results of the summit were described by Climate Action Tracker as a step forward in the fight against climate change, even though there is still a long way to go to reach the 1.5 degrees target. The most important commitments were made by United States, United Kingdom, European Union, China and Japan. At the summit the Biden administration submitted a new Nationally Determined Contribution to the United Nations Framework Convention on Climate Change (UNFCCC), according to Climate Action Tracker "the biggest climate step made by any US government in history".

At the summit Biden's administration launched a number of coalitions and initiatives to limit climate change and help to reduce its impacts, among others a Global Climate Ambition Initiative to help low income countries achieve those targets, and a "Net-Zero Producers Forum, with Canada, Norway, Qatar, and Saudi Arabia, together representing 40% of global oil and gas production"

Several countries increased their climate pledges in the summit. Several countries deliver vague promises, and statements:

In the beginning of May, 2021, Climate Action Tracker released a more detailed report about the significance of the summit. According to the report the summit, together with the pledges made from September 2020, reduce the expected rise in temperature by 2100 by 0.2 degrees. If all pledges are fulfilled the temperature will rise by 2.4°C. However, if the policies will remain as they are now it will rise by 2.9°C. In the most optimistic scenario, if the countries will fulfill also the pledges that are not part of Paris agreement it will rise by 2.0°C.

Use of masks 
After the summit, there were claims spread that Joe Biden was the only leader there wearing a mask, which was later proved was wrong as at least 5 other world leaders were wearing masks.

Notes

References

External Links 
 whitehouse.gov: 
 President Biden Invites 40 World Leaders to Leaders Summit on Climate (March 26)
 Leaders Summit on Climate Summary of Proceedings (April 23)
 Remarks by President Biden at the Virtual Leaders Summit on Climate Opening Session (April 22)
 Remarks by President Biden at the Virtual Leaders Summit on Climate Session 2: Investing in Climate Solutions

International conferences in the United States
2021 in international relations
2021 in American politics
2021 conferences
2021 in the United States
April 2021 events in the United States
Presidency of Joe Biden
Politics of climate change
Emissions reduction